In the 1860s, the Copperheads, also known as Peace Democrats, were a faction of Democrats in the Union who opposed the American Civil War and wanted an immediate peace settlement with the Confederates.

Republicans started calling anti-war Democrats "Copperheads" after the eastern copperhead (Agkistrodon contortrix), a species of venomous snake. Those Democrats accepted the label, reinterpreting the copper "head" as the likeness of Liberty, which they cut from Liberty Head large cent coins and proudly wore as badges. By contrast, Democratic supporters of the war were called War Democrats. Notable Copperheads included two Democratic Congressmen from Ohio: Clement L. Vallandigham and Alexander Long. Republican prosecutors accused some prominent Copperheads of treason in a series of trials in 1864.

Copperheadism was a highly contentious grassroots movement. It had its strongest base just north of the Ohio River and in some urban ethnic wards. Historians such as Wood Gray, Jennifer Weber and Kenneth M. Stampp have argued that it represented a traditionalistic element alarmed at the rapid modernization of society sponsored by the Republican Party and that it looked back to Jacksonian democracy for inspiration. Weber argues that the Copperheads damaged the Union war effort by opposing conscription, encouraging desertion, and forming conspiracies. Still, other historians say that the draft was already in disrepute and that the Republicans greatly exaggerated the conspiracies for partisan reasons.

Historians such as Gray and Weber argue that the Copperheads were inflexibly rooted in the past and were naive about the refusal of the Confederates to return to the Union. Convinced that the Republicans were ruining the traditional world they loved, they were obstructionist partisans. In turn, the Copperheads became a significant target of the National Union Party in the 1864 presidential election, where they were used to discredit the leading Democratic candidates.

Copperhead support increased when Union armies did poorly and decreased when they won great victories. After the fall of Atlanta in September 1864, Union military success seemed assured, and Copperheadism collapsed.

Name
A possible origin of the name came from a New York Times newspaper account in April 1861 that stated that when postal officers in Washington, D.C., opened a mail bag from a state now in the Confederacy:

Agenda 

During the American Civil War (1861–1865), the Copperheads nominally favored the Union and strongly opposed the war, for which they blamed abolitionists. They demanded immediate peace and resisted draft laws. They wanted President Abraham Lincoln and the Republicans ousted from power, seeing the President as a tyrant destroying American republican values with despotic and arbitrary actions.

Some Copperheads tried to persuade Union soldiers to desert. They talked of helping Confederate prisoners of war seize their camps and escape. They sometimes met with Confederate agents and took money. The Confederacy encouraged their activities whenever possible.

Newspapers 
The Copperheads had numerous important newspapers, but the editors never allied. In Chicago, Wilbur F. Storey made the Chicago Times into Lincoln's most vituperative enemy. The New York Journal of Commerce, originally abolitionist, was sold to owners who became Copperheads, giving them an important voice in the largest city. A typical editor was Edward G. Roddy, owner of the Uniontown, Pennsylvania Genius of Liberty. He was an intensely partisan Democrat who saw African Americans as an inferior race and Lincoln as a despot and dunce. Although he supported the war effort in 1861, he blamed abolitionists for prolonging the war and denounced the government as increasingly despotic. By 1864, he was calling for peace at any price.

John Mullaly's Metropolitan Record was the official Catholic newspaper in New York City. Reflecting Irish American opinion, it supported the war until 1863 before becoming a Copperhead organ. In the spring and summer of 1863, the paper urged its Irish working-class readers to pursue armed resistance to the draft passed by Congress earlier in the year. When the draft began in the city, working-class European Americans, largely Irish, responded with violent riots from July 13 to 16, lynching, beating and hacking to death more than 100 black New Yorkers and burning down black-owned businesses and institutions, including an orphanage for 233 black children. On August 19, 1864, John Mullaly was arrested for inciting resistance to the draft.

Even in an era of extremely partisan journalism, Copperhead newspapers were remarkable for their angry rhetoric. Wisconsin newspaper editor Marcus M. Pomeroy of the La Crosse Democrat referred to Lincoln as "Fungus from the corrupt womb of bigotry and fanaticism" and a "worse tyrant and more inhuman butcher than has existed since the days of Nero ... The man who votes for Lincoln now is a traitor and murderer ... And if he is elected to misgovern for another four years, we trust some bold hand will pierce his heart with dagger point for the public good".

Copperhead resistance 

The Copperheads sometimes talked of violent resistance and, in some cases, started to organize. However, they never actually made an organized attack. As war opponents, Copperheads were suspected of disloyalty, and their leaders were sometimes arrested and held for months in military prisons without trial. One famous example was General Ambrose Burnside's 1863 General Order Number 38, issued in Ohio, which made it an offense (to be tried in military court) to criticize the war in any way. The order was used to arrest Ohio congressman Clement L. Vallandigham when he criticized the order itself. However, Lincoln commuted his sentence while requiring his exile to the Confederacy.

Probably the largest Copperhead group was the Knights of the Golden Circle. Formed in Ohio in the 1850s, it became politicized in 1861. It reorganized as the Order of American Knights in 1863 and again in early 1864 as the Order of the Sons of Liberty, with Vallandigham as its commander. One leader, Harrison H. Dodd, advocated the violent overthrow of the governments of Indiana, Illinois, Kentucky, and Missouri in 1864. Democratic Party leaders and a Federal investigation thwarted his conspiracy. Despite this Copperhead setback, tensions remained high. The Charleston Riot took place in Illinois in March 1864. Indiana Republicans then used the sensational revelation of an antiwar Copperhead conspiracy by elements of the Sons of Liberty to discredit Democrats in the 1864 House elections. The military trial of Lambdin P. Milligan and other Sons of Liberty revealed plans to set free the Confederate prisoners held in the state. The culprits were sentenced to hang, but the Supreme Court intervened in Ex parte Milligan, saying they should have received civilian trials.

Most Copperheads actively participated in politics. On May 1, 1863, former Congressman Vallandigham declared the war was being fought not to save the Union but to free the blacks and enslave Southern whites. The U.S. Army then arrested him for declaring sympathy for the enemy. He was court-martialed by the Army and sentenced to imprisonment, but Lincoln commuted the sentence to banishment behind Confederate lines. The Democrats nevertheless nominated him for governor of Ohio in 1863. He left the Confederacy and went to Canada, where he campaigned for governor but lost after an intense battle. He operated behind the scenes at the 1864 Democratic convention in Chicago. This convention adopted a largely Copperhead platform and selected Ohio Representative George Pendleton (a known Peace Democrat) as the vice-presidential candidate. However, it chose a pro-war presidential candidate, General George B. McClellan. The contradiction severely weakened the party's chances to defeat Lincoln.

Characteristics 
The values of the Copperheads reflected the Jacksonian democracy of an earlier agrarian society. The Copperhead movement attracted Southerners who had settled north of the Ohio River, and the poor and merchants who had lost profitable Southern trade.<ref name=Norton>Mary Beth Norton, et al. A People and a Nation, A History of the United States" Vol I, (Houghton Mifflin Co., 2001) pp. 393–395.</ref> They were most numerous in border areas, including southern parts of Ohio, Illinois, and Indiana (in Missouri, comparable groups were avowed Confederates).

The movement had scattered bases of support outside the lower Midwest. A Copperhead element in Connecticut dominated the Democratic Party there. The Copperhead coalition included many Irish American Catholics in eastern cities, mill towns and mining camps (especially in the Pennsylvania coal fields). They were also numerous in German Catholic areas of the Midwest, especially Wisconsin.

Historian Kenneth Stampp has captured the Copperhead spirit in his depiction of Congressman Daniel W. Voorhees of Indiana: 

 Historiography 
Two central questions have run through the historiography of the Copperheads, i.e., "How serious a threat did they pose to the Union war effort and hence to the nation's survival?" and "to what extent and with what justification did the Lincoln administration and other Republican officials violate civil liberties to contain the perceived menace?".

The first book-length scholarly treatment of the Copperheads was The Hidden Civil War: The Story of the Copperheads (1942) by Wood Gray: in it, Gray decried the "defeatism" of the Copperheads and argued that they deliberately served the Confederacy's war aims. Also in 1942, George Fort Milton published Abraham Lincoln and the Fifth Column, which likewise condemned the traitorous Copperheads and praised Lincoln as a model defender of democracy.

Gilbert R. Tredway, a professor of history, in his 1973 study Democratic Opposition to the Lincoln Administration in Indiana found most Indiana Democrats were loyal to the Union and desired national reunification. He documented Democratic counties in Indiana having outperformed Republican counties in recruiting soldiers. Tredway found that Copperhead sentiment was uncommon among the rank-and-file Democrats in Indiana.

The chief historians who favored the Copperheads are Richard O. Curry and Frank L. Klement. Klement devoted most of his career to debunking the idea that the Copperheads represented a danger to the Union. Klement and Curry have downplayed the treasonable activities of the Copperheads, arguing the Copperheads were traditionalists who fiercely resisted modernization and wanted to return to the old ways. Klement argued in the 1950s that the Copperheads' activities, especially their supposed participation in treasonous anti-Union secret societies, were mostly false inventions by Republican propaganda machines designed to discredit the Democrats at election time. Curry sees Copperheads as poor traditionalists battling against the railroads, banks, and modernization. In his standard history Battle Cry of Freedom (1988), James M. McPherson asserted Klement had taken "revision a bit too far. There was some real fire under that smokescreen of Republican propaganda".

Jennifer Weber's Copperheads: The Rise and Fall of Lincoln's Opponents in the North (2006) agrees more with Gray and Milton than with Klement. She argues that first, Northern antiwar sentiment was strong, so strong that Peace Democrats came close to seizing control of their party in mid-1864. Second, she shows the peace sentiment led to deep divisions and occasional violence across the North. Third, Weber concluded that the peace movement deliberately weakened the Union military effort by undermining both enlistment and the operation of the draft. Indeed, Lincoln had to divert combat troops to retake control of New York City from the anti-draft rioters in 1863. Fourth, Weber shows how the attitudes of Union soldiers affected partisan battles back home. The soldiers' rejection of Copperheadism and overwhelming support for Lincoln's reelection in 1864 was decisive in securing the Northern victory and the preservation of the Union. The Copperheads' appeal, she argues, waxed and waned with Union failures and successes in the field.

 Notable Copperhead Democrats 
 Jesse D. Bright of Indiana
 Henry Clay Dean of Virginia
 Alexander Long of Ohio
 Edson B. Olds of Ohio
 George Pendleton of Ohio
 Thomas H. Seymour of Connecticut
 Rodman M. Price of New Jersey
 James W. Wall of New Jersey
 William Wright of New Jersey
 Fernando Wood of New York
 Benjamin Wood of New York
 James Brooks of New York
 Clement Vallandigham of Ohio
 William Allen of Ohio
 Daniel W. Voorhees of Indiana
 Joseph W. White of Ohio
 John Reynolds of Illinois
 Ira Allen Eastman of New Hampshire
 George W. Woodward of Pennsylvania
 Carter Harrison Sr. of Illinois
 William W. Eaton of Connecticut
 James C. Robinson of Illinois
 Thomas G. Pratt of Maryland
 Benjamin G. Harris of Maryland
 Thomas D. English of New Jersey
 C. Chauncey Burr of New York
 Marcus M. Pomeroy of Wisconsin
 Wilbur F. Storey of Illinois
 William Taylor Davidson of Illinois
 Lewis W. Ross of Illinois
 Nathan Lord President of Dartmouth College
 Henry C. Dean of Iowa
 Andrew Humphreys of Indiana
 William A. Wallace of Pennsylvania

 See also 
 American election campaigns in the 19th century
 Bourbon Democrat
 Butternut (people)
 Copperhead (2013 film)
 Doughface
 Opposition to the American Civil War
 Red Strings

 Notes 

 Further reading 
 Calhoun, Charles W. "The Fire in the Rear", Reviews in American History (2007) 35#4 pp. 530–537 10.1353/rah.2007.0078 online; Historiography.
 Cowden, Joanna D. "The Politics of Dissent: Civil War Democrats in Connecticut", The New England Quarterly, 56#4 (December 1983), pp. 538–554 in JSTOR.
 Cowden, Joanna D., "Heaven Will Frown on Such a Cause as This": Six Democrats Who Opposed Lincoln's War. (UP of America, 2001). xviii, 259pp. 
 Curry, Richard O. "Copperheadism and Continuity: the Anatomy of a Stereotype", Journal of Negro History (1972) 57(1): 29–36. in JSTOR.
 Curry, Richard O. "The Union as it Was: a Critique of Recent Interpretations of the 'Copperheads'". Civil War History 1967 13(1): 25–39.
 George, Joseph Jr. "'Abraham Africanus I': President Lincoln Through the Eyes of a Copperhead Editor". Civil War History 1968 14(3): 226–239.
 George, Joseph Jr. "'A Catholic Family Newspaper' Views the Lincoln Administration: John Mullaly's Copperhead Weekly". Civil War History 1978 24(2): 112–132.
 Gray, Wood. The Hidden Civil War: The Story of the Copperheads (1942), emphasizes treasonous activity.
 Hershock, Martin J. "Copperheads and Radicals: Michigan Partisan Politics during the Civil War Era, 1860–1865", Michigan Historical Review (1992) 18#1 pp. 28–69.
 Kleen, Michael, "The Copperhead Threat in Illinois: Peace Democrats, Loyalty Leagues, and the Charleston Riot of 1864", Journal of the Illinois State Historical Society (2012), 105#1 pp. 69–92.
 Klement, Frank L. The Copperheads in the Middle West (1960).
 Klement, Frank L. The Limits of Dissent: Clement L. Vallandigham and the Civil War (1998).
 Klement, Frank L. Lincoln's Critics: The Copperheads of the North (1999).
 Klement, Frank L. Dark Lanterns: Secret Political Societies, Conspiracies, and Treason Trials in the Civil War (1984).
 Landis, Michael Todd. Northern Men with Southern Loyalties: The Democratic Party and the Sectional Crisis. Ithaca, NY: Cornell University Press, 2014.
 Lendt, David L. Demise of the Democracy: The Copperhead Press in Iowa. (1973).
 Lendt, David L. "Iowa and the Copperhead Movement". Annals of Iowa 1970 40(6): 412–426.
 Manber, Jeffrey, Dahlstrom, Neil. Lincoln's Wrath: Fierce Mobs, Brilliant Scoundrels and a President's Mission to Destroy the Press (2005).
 Milton, George F. Abraham Lincoln and the Fifth Column (1942).
 Nevins, Allan. The War for the Union (4 vols. 1959–1971), the standard scholarly history of wartime politics and society.
 Rodgers, Thomas E. "Copperheads or a Respectable Minority: Current Approaches to the Study of Civil War-Era Democrats". Indiana Magazine of History 109#2 (2013): 114–146. in JSTOR; historiography focused on Klement, Weber and Silbey.
 Silbey, Joel H. A Respectable Minority: The Democratic Party in the Civil War Era, 1860–1868 (1977) online edition.
 Stampp, Kenneth M. Indiana Politics during the Civil War (1949) online edition.
  Smith, Adam. No Party Now: Politics in the Civil War North (2006), excerpt and text search.
 Tidwell, William A. April '65: Confederate Covert Action in the American Civil War. (1995).
 Walsh, Justin E. "To Print the News and Raise Hell: Wilbur F. Storey's Chicago 'Times'". Journalism Quarterly (1963) 40#4 pp. 497–510. doi: 10.1177/107769906304000402.
 Weber, Jennifer L. Copperheads: The Rise and Fall of Lincoln's Opponents in the North (2006).
 Wertheim, Lewis J. "The Indianapolis Treason Trials, the Elections of 1864 and the Power of the Partisan Press". Indiana Magazine of History 1989 85(3): 236–250.
 Wubben, Hubert H. Civil War Iowa and the Copperhead Movement (1980).

 External links 
 The Old Guard – a Copperhead magazine 1863–1867
 Ohio Copperhead History''
 An Anti-Copperhead Broadside Denouncing Former President Franklin Pierce As A Traitor. Shapell Manuscript Foundation

American Civil War political groups
Anti-war movement
Factions in the Democratic Party (United States)

Metaphors referring to snakes
Ohio in the American Civil War